Our World may refer to:

 Our World, a magazine for African-American readers founded by John P. Davis and published from 1946 to 1957
Nuestro Mundo, translated to English as Our World, the first gay rights organization in Latin America

Music 
 Our World (album), a 2009 album by T.O.K.
 Our World: Fallen, a 2007 album by FLAME
 Our World: Redeemed, a 2008 album by FLAME

Television 
 Our World (1967 TV program), the first worldwide live satellite TV program in 1967
 Our World (1986 TV program), a 1986–1987 American television news program exploring historical events
 Our World (2007 TV program), a BBC News (TV channel) and BBC World News documentary series

See also
 Nash Mir, a 1907 Russian periodical
 Our World, Our Way, album by Dem Franchize Boyz